Viswalingam Manivannan is a Sri Lankan Tamil politician belonging to the Tamil National People's Front.He is the Mayor of Jaffna.

References 

Sri Lankan Tamil politicians
Mayors of Jaffna
Living people
Year of birth missing (living people)